The 1953 All-Ireland Senior Football Championship Final was the 66th All-Ireland Final and the deciding match of the 1953 All-Ireland Senior Football Championship, an inter-county Gaelic football tournament for the top teams in Ireland.

Match

Summary
Mal McEvoy scored an early goal for Armagh, who led by two points after 40 minutes, before Kerry began to pile on the points. Armagh's Bill McCorry missed a penalty and Kerry won by four points.

It was the first of three All-Ireland football titles won by Kerry in the 1950s.

This was also the first Championship meeting of Armagh and Kerry.

With just over 90,000 spectators in attendance, some of whom had broken through a gate to gain access, it was the biggest crowd ever witnessed at Croke Park at the time.

The record attendance was beaten in the 1961 All-Ireland Senior Football Championship Final when Down beat Offaly before 90,556 fans.

Details

References

All-Ireland Senior Football Championship Final
All-Ireland Senior Football Championship Final, 1953
All-Ireland Senior Football Championship Final, 1953
All-Ireland Senior Football Championship Finals
All-Ireland Senior Football Championship Finals
Armagh county football team matches
Kerry county football team matches